Indarbela obliquifasciata is a moth in the family Cossidae. It is found in China (Guangdong, Hong Kong).

References

Natural History Museum Lepidoptera generic names catalog

Metarbelinae
Moths described in 1923